Dragon Park is the Wales National Football Development Centre in the city of Newport, South Wales.

The centre is located at the Newport International Sports Village, Lliswerry in the east of Newport near Newport Stadium and the Wales National Velodrome. It was officially opened 20 April 2013 by Michel Platini, President of UEFA. The £5M complex was a joint venture between UEFA, the Football Association of Wales, Sport Wales and Newport City Council.

The Centre is intended to develop the Wales under-21, Wales women's and younger age-group squads. The centre includes two grass pitches and one artificial turf pitch. The centre also provides headquarters for the Welsh Football Trust, the game's development body, with analysis suites, sports science laboratories and coach education facilities.

See also
 Wales national football team

References

2013 establishments in Wales
Dragon
Stadiums in Newport, Wales
Football venues in Wales
Landmarks in Newport, Wales
Association football training grounds in Wales
Organisations based in Newport, Wales
National football academies